Northern Australia Beef Roads Program is a suite of projects designed to deliver targeted upgrades to key roads for transporting cattle in northern Australia. In 2016 the Australian Government announced 18 projects to be funded under this program. This program is separate to the Northern Australia Roads Program, also announced in 2016, which contains a further 20 projects.

Funding and program status
Funding by the Australian Government is up to 80% of total costs, with the remainder being met by state, territory and local governments. The initial funding allocation by the Australian Government was $100 million, most of which has now (in April 2022) been expended on the identified projects, most of which have been completed or are nearing completion.

Type of work
The work undertaken includes road widening, sealing and pavement renewal.

Projects
The roads involved in the 18 projects are listed below.

Queensland
 Road Network, covering parts of:
 Capricorn Highway
 Bruce Highway
 Rockhampton-Yeppoon Road (Yaamba Road, Musgrave Street, Queen Elizabeth Drive)
 Rockhampton-Emu Park Road (Bridge Street, Lakes Creek Road, Emu Park Road)
 Burke Developmental Road (2 projects)
 Clermont-Alpha Road (3 projects)
 Ootann Road (2 projects)
 Gregory Developmental Road
 Richmond-Croydon Road (2 projects)
 Cloncurry-Dajarra Road
 Diamantina Developmental Road
 Richmond-Winton Road (2 projects)

Northern Territory
 Barkly Stock Route
 Tablelands Highway

Western Australia
 Great Northern Highway

Project details
Project details have been included in each wikipedia article.

White Paper on Developing Northern Australia
The Northern Australia Beef Roads Program is part of the White Paper on Developing Northern Australia, a $600 million commitment to upgrade high priority roads in northern Australia.

Parliamentary report
The Parliament of Australia has produced a report on transport infrastructure that includes extensive details of the Northern Australia Beef Roads Program, among others.

See also
 Northern Australia
 Road transport in Australia

References

External links 
 Our North, Our Future: White Paper on Developing Northern Australia

Northern Australia
Roads in Australia
Lists of roads in Australia